Events in the year 1934 in Mexico.

Incumbents

Federal government 
 President: Abelardo L. Rodríguez (until November 30), Lázaro Cárdenas (starting December 1)
 Interior Secretary (SEGOB): 
 Secretary of Foreign Affairs (SRE): 
 Communications Secretary (SCT): 
 Education Secretary (SEP): 
 Secretary of Defense (SEDENA):

Supreme Court 

 President of the Supreme Court: Francisco H. Ruiz then Daniel V. Valencia

Governors 
 Aguascalientes: Juan G. Alvarado Lavallade
 Campeche: Eduardo Mena Córdova
 Chiapas: Victórico R. Grajales
 Chihuahua: Rodrigo M. Quevedo
 Coahuila: Jesús Valdez Sánchez
 Colima: Miguel G. Santa Ana
 Durango: Enrique R. Calderón 
 Guanajuato: José Inocente Lugo
 Guerrero: José Inocente Lugo
 Hidalgo: Ernesto Viveros
 Jalisco: Everardo Topete
 State of Mexico: Eucario López
 Michoacán: Rafael Ordorica
 Morelos: José Refugio Bustamante
 Nayarit: Joaquín Cardoso
 Nuevo León: Gregorio Morales Sánchez
 Oaxaca: Anastasio García Toledo
 Puebla: Gustavo Ariza
 Querétaro: Ramón Rodríguez Familiar
 San Luis Potosí: Mateo Fernández Netro
 Sinaloa: Manuel Páez
 Sonora: Ramón Ramos
 Tabasco: Víctor Fernández Manero
 Tamaulipas: Enrique Canseco
 Tlaxcala: Adolfo Bonilla	
 Veracruz: Miguel Alemán Valdés
 Yucatán: Fernando Cárdenas
 Zacatecas: Matías Ramos

Events 

 February 5 – the bandera militar flag of Mexico is adopted.
 November 30 – Lázaro Cárdenas becomes president of Mexico after winning the federal elections.

Popular culture

Sports

Music

Film
 Dos monjes
 Janitzio
 Mujeres sin alma

Literature

Notable births
 February 7 – Juan Corona, serial killer (d. 2019)
February 17 — Salvador Flores Huerta, Mexican Roman Catholic prelate, Bishop of Ciudad Lázaro Cárdenas (1993–2006) (d. 2018).
 March 28 – Sixto Valencia Burgos, caricaturist
 May 1 – Cuauhtémoc Cárdenas, politician, founder of the Party of the Democratic Revolution.
May 4 — Humberto Lugo Gil, Governor of Hidalgo 1998–1999
 June 15 – Rubén Aguirre, television actor
June 20 — Rius (Eduardo Humberto del Río García), political cartoonist and writer (d. 2017)
 June 25 – Beatriz Sheridan, Mexican actress, director (d. 2006)
July 22 — Eric del Castillo, actor
September 21 — Maria Rubio, actress (d. 2018).
 December 12
Leopoldo Flores, artist, member of the Salón de la Plástica Mexicana (d. April 3, 1934).
Miguel de la Madrid Hurtado, president of Mexico (1982–1988)
Guadalupe Robledo (José Lothario), wrestler and manager (NWA, WWE, CWF).(d. 2018)

References

 
Mexico